The Vacha is a river in south Bulgaria, one of the main right tributaries of the Maritsa. It is 104 km long and is formed by the confluence of the rivers Buynovska (cirillic: Буйновска река), Trigradska (cirillic: триградска река) and a small unnamed river.

Background
The Vacha passes through Krichim Dam and Vacha Dam that secure drinking water for Plovdiv and its plains. It runs through the Rhodopes forming a deep valley where the two dams are located. An important town in the valley is Devin. It is the second largest river that has its source in the Rhodopes after the Arda. The Vacha does not flow close to any industrial enterprises, which is the reason for its clear water. The origin of its valley is similar to that of the Chepelare River.

External links

 Vacha River Discover Bulgaria

References

Rivers of Bulgaria
Landforms of Smolyan Province
Landforms of Pazardzhik Province
Landforms of Plovdiv Province